DZAG (97.1 FM) Radyo Pilipinas is a radio station owned by the Philippine Broadcasting Service. The station's studio and transmitter are located inside the Don Mariano Marcos Memorial State University campus, Dona Toribia Aspiras Rd., Agoo.

References

Radio stations in La Union
Radio stations established in 1974